The Brisi is a mountain of the Churfirsten group, located in the Appenzell Alps. It overlooks Lake Walenstadt in the canton of St. Gallen. The summit is easily accessible by trail but via the north side in Toggenburg only.

References

External links
Brisi on Summitpost
Agencija za čišćenje tepiha, poslovnog prostora, stanova, zgrada: Beograd

Mountains of the Alps
Mountains of Switzerland
Mountains of the canton of St. Gallen
Appenzell Alps

pl:Hinterrugg